Nino Tempo & April Stevens (Antonino and Carol Vincinette LoTempio) are a brother and sister singing act from Niagara Falls, New York. Formed in the early 1960s when Nino Tempo and April Stevens signed as a duo with Atco Records, they had a string of Billboard hits and earned a Grammy Award as "best rock & roll record of the year" for the single "Deep Purple".

"Deep Purple"
"Deep Purple" (1963) is notable for April Stevens speaking the lyrics in a low, sweet voice during the second half of the song while her brother sings. When the duo first recorded the song as a demo, Tempo forgot the words, and Stevens spoke the lyrics to remind him. The producers thought Stevens' spoken interlude was "cute" and should be included on the finished product, but according to Stevens, her brother was not as easily convinced; "He didn't want anyone talking while he was singing!" The duo would employ this tactic again on "Whispering."

Producer Ahmet Ertegün had originally intended "Deep Purple" to be the B-side of a song called "I've Been Carrying A Torch For You So Long That It Burned A Great Big Hole In My Heart"; he was dubious of Tempo's belief that it would be a hit, calling it "the most embarrassing thing" the duo had ever recorded. When radio stations preferred "Deep Purple," Ertegun relented, and so "I've Been Carrying A Torch ..." was the longest title of a flipside of a Billboard number one record, until Prince's "When Doves Cry" in 1984 had "17 Days ..." on its flipside.

Despite being considered "rock and roll," "Deep Purple" also reached number one on Billboard'''s Adult Contemporary singles chart.
The record had been preceded in 1962 by a single in a similar style, "Sweet and Lovely," and was followed by a series of singles of more oldies similarly arranged, including "Whispering", "Stardust", and "Tea for Two".

Later career
Music journalist Richie Unterberger has described the later disc All Strung Out as Nino Tempo & April Stevens' "greatest triumph", declaring it "one of the greatest Phil Spector-inspired productions of all time". For years following their charting singles, the duo continued recording, but failed to achieve continued sales success.

However, in March 1973 the duo scored a number 5 hit in the Netherlands with "Love Story" on A&M Records, two years after Andy Williams took that same song to number 13 in the Dutch Top 40.

Select discography

AlbumsNino Tempo's Rock 'N Roll Beach Party (1956) Liberty Records LRP3023A Nino Tempo - April Stevens Program Nino Tempo (Side One) & April Stevens (Side Two) RCA Camden CAS 824Deep Purple (1963) Atco 33-156 (Mono) and Atco SD 33-156 (Stereo)Nino And April Sing the Great Songs (1964) Atco 33-162 (Mono) and Atco SD 33-162 (Stereo)Hey Baby! (1966) Atco 33-180 (Mono) and Atco SD 33-180 (Stereo)All Strung Out (1966) White Whale WW-113 (Mono) and White Whale WW-7113 (Stereo)Come See Me 'Round Midnight (Nino Tempo & 5th Avenue Sax) A&M SP3629Love Story and Their Hits of Yesterday, Today And Tomorrow Nino Tempo & April Stevens (Shown as Nino & April, New A&M Singles, plus five early hits. Re-recorded and released only in Europe) A&M 87 980 ITSweet And Lovely - The Best Of'' (the best of compilation plus two new songs: "I'm Fallin' For You" (previously unreleased recording from 1985) and "Why Don't You Do Right?" (new 1996 recording)) (1996) Varese Sarabande Records VSD-5592

Singles

Notes

References

External links
Official website

American pop music groups
Grammy Award winners
Atco Records artists
A&M Records artists
Bell Records artists
Sibling musical duos
Musicians from Niagara Falls, New York
Musical groups established in the 1960s
Male–female musical duos